Substitute may refer to:

Film
 Substitute (film), a 2006 film by Vikash Dhorasoo
 The Substitute (1993 film), a telefilm by Martin Donovan
 The Substitute, a 1996 thriller film starring Tom Berenger
 The Substitute 2: School's Out, a 1998 action-crime-thriller starring Treat Williams
 The Substitute 3: Winner Takes All, a 1999 action thriller starring Treat Williams
 The Substitute: Failure Is Not an Option, a 2001 action thriller starring Treat Williams
 The Substitute (2007 film), a Danish science fiction horror film
 The Substitute (2015 film), a short film
 The Substitute (2022 film), a 2022 film directed by Diego Lerman

Politics 
 Substitute (elections)

Television
 "Substitute" (Beavis and Butt-head episode), an episode of Beavis and Butt-head
 "The Substitute" (Glee), a Glee episode
 "The Substitute" (Lost), an episode of Lost
 "The Substitute" (Recess episode), an episode of Recess
 The Substitute (Chinese TV series), a 2015 Chinese thriller television series released on iQIYI
 The Substitute (American TV series), a 2019 American television series on Nickelodeon

Music
 "Substitute" (The Righteous Brothers song), 1975
 "Substitute" (The Who song), 1966
 The Substitute (soundtrack), the soundtrack to the 1996 crime film

Other
 Substitution (sport)
 Substitute (association football)
 Substitute (cricket), in sports
 Substitute good, in economics, a good that can be used instead of another
 Ersatz good, in economics, a substitute good, inferior in quality
 Substitute character, on keyboards, a control character used in the place of another character
 Substitute natural gas
 Substitute teacher, a temporary replacement in a teacher's absence

See also

 
 Interchange (Australian rules football)
 Makeshift (disambiguation)
 Placeholder (disambiguation)
 Sub (disambiguation)
 Substitution (disambiguation)